The Sunny Hill Festival is an annual international music festival in Pristina, Kosovo, organised by Dua Lipa and her father Dukagjin Lipa. Though intended to take place annually since 2018, the 2020 and 2021 editions were cancelled due to the COVID-19 pandemic.

Editions

2018
The first edition of the festival took place on 10 to 12 August 2018 at the Germia Park, near Pristina in Kosovo. According to the organizers, more than 18,000 people attended the festival. However, the New York Times reported that the venue's capacity of 15,000 seats had not been filled. The cost of the tickets was $55, which was criticized by many due to the high unemployment rate, especially among young people. The festival was organized by the singer Dua Lipa together with her father to raise money for the Sunny Hill Foundation.

Dua Lipa was the headliner and her father also performed with his band, ODA and belonged to another line-up alongside many artists from Kosovo and Albania, among other Action Bronson and Martin Garrix. Bronson, who is a supporter of the legalization of cannabis, was arrested by the Kosovar police after his performance at the festival for smoking a joint on stage and sharing it with the audience.

2019
The second edition of the Sunny Hill Festival took place on 2, 3 and 4 August 2019 at the Gërmia Park in Pristina. The festival featured performances by international acts, including Calvin Harris, Gashi, Klangkarussell and Miley Cyrus as well as Dua Lipa, in addition to several musicians of Albanian origin, namely Buta, Elvana Gjata, Ilira, Kejsi Tola, Kida, Ledri Vula, Lyrical Son, MC Kresha, Njomza and Yll Limani who performed as well.

2020-2021
Due to the COVID-19 pandemic, the festival did not take place in 2020 and 2021.

2022
In July 2021, Dua Lipa announced that a third edition of the Sunny Hill Festival has been scheduled to take place in 2022 in Pristina on 4–7 August. On 14 June 2022, Sunny Hill Festival through a post on the official Twitter account confirmed that the festival has moved from Pristina to Tirana due to delays from authorities in providing the needed licenses for the location. Six days later, Sunny Hill Festival again through a post on the official Twitter account confirmed that the festival returns to Pristina and will be held from 4 to 7 August, while in Tirana will be held from 26 to 28 August.

References

External links 
 

Dua Lipa
Music festivals in Kosovo
Music festivals in Albania
2018 music festivals
2019 music festivals
2022 music festivals